Robert "Bernie" Bernthal is an American retired soccer forward who played professionally in Europe and the United States before becoming a professional skier and mountain climber.

In 1979, Bernthal signed with FC Limoges. He returned to the United States in 1980 and joined the Hartford Hellions of the Major Indoor Soccer League. In October 1981, Bernthal signed with the Pittsburgh Spirit. In 1983, he moved to FC La Chaux-de-Fonds. Bernthal retired in 1984 and became a professional skier and mountain climber. From 1995 to 2001, he worked as the special events coordinator for The Swatch Group. In 2004, he became the European brand director for K2 Sports.

References

External links 
 MISL stats

Living people
1960 births
American soccer players
American expatriate soccer players
American expatriate sportspeople in France
American expatriate sportspeople in Switzerland
Expatriate footballers in France
Expatriate footballers in Switzerland
FC La Chaux-de-Fonds players
Hartford Hellions players
Limoges FC players
Major Indoor Soccer League (1978–1992) players
Pittsburgh Spirit players
People from Manhasset, New York
Soccer players from New York (state)
Association football forwards